Pula Airport is the international airport serving Pula, Croatia, and is located 6 km from the city centre. It served 777,568 passengers in 2019. The airport is designated as the alternative airport for parts of Slovenia and a multitude of cities in eastern Italy. It serves as a major access point to city of Pula, as well as most of Istria, most notably Brijuni national park.

History 

Pula Airport at current location was initially used only for military purposes but has been changed to civil airport as of 1 May 1967 and saw 701,370 passengers in 1987. Same year works on new terminal building began and were completed by 1989 with capacity of 1 million passengers per year. Croatian War of Independence has caused sharp decline in passenger numbers. Airport has seen steady increase in passenger volume over the next 3 decades, surpassing previous record in 2018. As most passengers flying to/from Pula airport are holiday makers flight numbers have a significant seasonal character.

Facilities 
Pula Airport has a single terminal building with capacity of 1 million passengers per year. Airport serves both domestic and international flights. Inside the terminal there are couple of café/snack bars as well as duty-free shop. None of the gates are equipped with jet bridges but rather the passengers walk from terminal building to the aircraft or are transferred by bus.

Because of its location and fairly good weather conditions whole year around, as well as lower flight numbers during winter months it is frequently used by European carriers for training flights.

Ground transportation 
Airport can be reached by dedicated bus line from centre of Pula. Schedule is adjusted on a monthly basis to meet the flights arrival/departure.

Airlines and destinations
The following airlines operate regular scheduled and charter flights at Pula Airport:

Statistics

Ground transportation
A bus that goes to/from the airport ("Pula Zracna Luka") and the Pula central bus terminal ("Bus Kolodvor").

A taxi can be taken to the outskirts of Pula (specifically, Verudela, where Hotel Palma and Histria are located).

Incidents and accidents
On 2 August 2009, a  private Piper PA-46-310P Malibu, from Frankfurt to Pula failed to extend its nose gear for landing. After several tries it ran out of fuel and landed on its main landing gear. When it landed, the nose of the airplane touched the runway and stopped, which resulted in substantial damage. There were no injuries reported among the 5 passengers.
On 21 September 2011, the left main gear on a private Piper PA-46-350P Malibu Mirage collapsed after it made a 180 turn to line-up with the runway. The runway was closed for 3 hours as a result. The plane received a minor damage and there were no injuries reported among the 4 passengers in the aircraft.

References

External links

 

Airports in Croatia
Airport
Buildings and structures in Istria County
Transport in Istria County